St. Mang's Abbey, Füssen or Füssen Abbey was a Benedictine monastery in Füssen in Bavaria, Germany. It was founded in the 9th century, and dissolved during the post-Napoleonic secularisation of Bavaria.

History 

The Benedictine abbey of Saint Mang was founded in the first half of the 9th century as a proprietary monastery of the Prince-Bishops of Augsburg. The reason for its foundation goes back to the hermit Magnus of Füssen (otherwise known as Saint Mang) and his Benedictine brother Theodor, both from the Abbey of Saint Gall, who built a cell and an oratory here, where he died on 6 September, although there is no record of which year.

The saint's body, amid miracles, was discovered uncorrupted, a proof of his sanctity, and the veneration of St. Mang was the spiritual basis of the monastery.

The foundation was not however solely spiritually motivated; there were practical political reasons underlying it as well. The monastery's key position not only on the important medieval road from Augsburg across the Alps to Upper Italy but also in the Füssen Gap ("Füssener Enge", the point where the river Lech breaks out of the Alps) gave it an immense strategic value, which made it of political concern both to the Bishops of Augsburg and to the Holy Roman Emperors.

The history of the abbey in the Middle Ages is principally marked by the efforts of the religious community to maintain a life true to the Rule of Saint Benedict amidst the various pressures caused by external social developments. Over time therefore the monks repeatedly embraced various reforms and reforming movements intended to bring about a return to the essentials of the Benedictine life. These reforms mostly resulted in spiritual and economic growth and an increase in the headcount, which in turn brought more building and commissions of artwork.

The energy of the Counter-Reformation found lasting expression in the construction of an enormous Baroque abbey complex between 1696 and 1726, commissioned by Abbot Gerhard Oberleitner (1696-1714), which still today, along with the High Castle (Hohe Schloss), characterises the town of Füssen.

The architect Johann Jakob Herkomer (1652-1717) succeeded in turning the irregular medieval abbey premises into a symmetrically organised complex of buildings. The transformation of the medieval basilica into a Baroque church based on Venetian models was intended to be an architectural symbol of the veneration of Saint Magnus. The entire church represents an enormous reliquary. For the first time in South German Baroque construction the legend of the local saint inspires the suite of frescoes throughout the entire church. The community at the time also set out to make the new church the envy of connoisseurs for the quality of its artworks. Among the artists who contributed various forms of decoration for the building were Anton Sturm, Franz Georg Hermann, Jakob Hiebeler and Paul Zeiller, whose only extant oil paintings are in the Chapter Hall.

Although the abbey was never able to obtain the coveted Reichsunmittelbarkeit (independence of all lordship except for that of the Emperor), it had a decisive influence as a centre of lordship and economy, cultural and faith life, on Füssen and the whole region.

Dissolution

On 11 December 1802, during the secularisation that followed the Napoleonic Wars and the Peace of Lunéville, the princes of Oettingen-Wallerstein were awarded possession of St. Mang. On 15 January 1803 Princess Wilhelmine ordered Abbot Aemilian Hafner to dissolve the abbey and vacate the premises by 1 March of that year.

The contents of the library were shipped off to the new owners down the Lech on rafts. Most of the items are now in the library of the University of Augsburg, except for a small collection of especially valuable manuscripts, which are in the Augsburg Diocesan Archives.

Later history

In 1837 the former abbey church was transferred as a gift to the parish of Füssen. In 1839 the Royal Bavarian chamberlain, Christoph Friedrich von Ponickau, bought the remaining lordship of St. Mang. In 1909 the town of Füssen acquired the Ponickau estate, including the former abbey buildings (apart from the church).

The north wing was used as the town hall. In the south wing the Füssen Town Museum is now located, with displays on the history of the abbey and of the town, particularly of the traditional manufacture of lutes and violins in Füssen. It is also possible to view the Baroque reception rooms of the abbey in the museum.

List of the abbots of St. Mang's Abbey, Füssen 

Until 919 there is no documentary evidence of the abbots of this abbey. Abbey tradition names Saint

Magnus as the founding abbot, and his successor as Blessed Conrad.

References

Sources
Lindner, Pirmin, 1913. Monasticon Episcopatus Augustani antiqui. Bregenz.
Ettelt, Rudibert, 1971. Geschichte der Stadt Füssen. Füssen.
Leistle, David. Die Aebte des St. Magnusstiftes in Füssen, in Studien und Mitteilungen zur Geschichte des Benediktinerordens und seiner Zweige, 1918-1920.
Riedmiller, Thomas, 2003: Das ehemalige Benediktinerkloster Sankt Mang in Füssen in Klosterland Bayerisch Schwaben (ed. W. Schiedermair). Lindenberg.

External links

 High Castle of Füssen
   Klöster in Bayern
  Historischer Verein Alt Füssen
St Mang Basilica Füssen

Monasteries in Bavaria
Benedictine monasteries in Germany
Christian monasteries established in the 9th century
1802 disestablishments
Füssen